Midlands Gold Westmeath was an Independent Local Radio service in Ireland, broadcasting to County Westmeath. It was an opt-out from Midlands 103 (formerly Midlands Radio 3), the ILR contractor for counties Westmeath. Laois, and Offaly, and broadcast from studios in Athlone (95.4FM) and Mullingar (96.5FM). It was operated as part of Midlands 103's sound broadcasting contract from the Broadcasting Commission of Ireland.

Its studios were located in:
Harbour Place Shopping Centre, Mullingar
Broadcast Centre, Monksland, Athlone

It was a community-driven local radio service for the people of County Westmeath.

References
Midlands 103 Radio Schedule

External links
www.midlandsradio.fm Official site

Defunct radio stations in the Republic of Ireland
Mass media in County Westmeath
Athlone
Mullingar